Govind Narain, ICS (5 May 1916 – 3 April 2012)  was an Indian civil servant who was member of the Indian Civil Service and served as the 3rd Governor of Karnataka.

He formerly served as 12th Defence Secretary of India (1973 to 1975),  Home Secretary of India (1971 to 1973) and the Chief Secretary of Uttar Pradesh (1958 to 1961). He is considered  to be one of India's most senior and respected civil servants. 

He also served as Adviser and Secretary to the King of Nepal from 1951 to 1954.

Early childhood and education
He was born  into a Kayastha family in Mainpuri, Uttar Pradesh and educated at the University of Allahabad and University of Oxford.

Career
He was selected as a member of the Indian Civil Service in 1939 and was Home Secretary of India and Defence Secretary of India before retirement. As Home Secretary, he played a crucial role during the Indo-Pakistani War of 1971. He then became Defence Secretary, a post he occupied between 1973 and 1975. He was also chief secretary of Uttar Pradesh, and was deputised to build relations between India and Nepal in 1951 as Adviser to the King of Nepal.

Political career
He was named Governor of Karnataka and held the post between 1977 and 1983. He was awarded the Padma Vibhushan in 2009.

References

External links
 Official Profile and Biography at Governors Office, Karnataka
 Govind Narain, one of the last surviving ICS officers, dead
 Govind Narain: The young ICS who protected Aligarh university
 Former Governor Govind Narain passes away

1916 births
People from Mainpuri
Indian Civil Service (British India) officers
Alumni of the University of Oxford
University of Allahabad alumni
Governors of Karnataka
Recipients of the Padma Vibhushan in public affairs
2012 deaths
Indian civil servants
Indian Home Secretaries
Defence Secretaries of India